Trans World Airlines Flight 800 was an international scheduled passenger service from Kansas City, Missouri to Cairo, Egypt via Chicago, New York City, Paris, Milan, Rome, and Athens. The Boeing 707 crashed during take off on runway 25 at Leonardo da Vinci–Fiumicino Airport, Rome at 13:09 GMT on a flight to Athens International Airport, Greece on 23 November 1964.

As the aircraft reached 80 knots during its take off roll, the instruments for engine number 4 indicated zero thrust. The flight crew assumed that this engine had failed; since the aircraft was below its V1, the safest course of action was to abort the take off, which was done when the aircraft was around 800 metres along the runway. This was accomplished by ordering full reverse thrust on all engines, as well as deploying their thrust reversers. The aircraft began to slow down, but not as quickly as expected. Its steering was also not functioning normally.

When a compactor began to cross the runway, the aircraft was unable to avoid striking it. Eventually the aircraft stopped a further 260 metres down the runway, and an evacuation began. This being said, smoke and flames blocked most of the passenger exits, making escape slow, and after only 23 of the 73 people on board had evacuated the aircraft exploded, killing the remaining 50.

A prominent fatality was passenger the Most Reverend Edward Celestin Daly, OP, Bishop of the Roman Catholic Diocese of Des Moines, Iowa, in the United States, who had just participated in Vatican Council II.

Cause

The root cause of the accident was determined to be an inoperative number 2 engine reverse thrust system, even though cockpit instruments showed that the reverser had deployed. This was caused by the disconnection of a duct, resulting in a lack of pressure in the pneumatic clamshell door actuating mechanism. This malfunction allowed the development of considerable forward thrust by number 2 engine even though the thrust levers for all four engines were in the "reverse" position, which both increased the plane's stopping distance as well as giving it a tendency to steer to the right.

At the time of the accident, maintenance work was being carried out on the end of runway 25 at the same time that it was being used by aircraft. This was judged safe as the amount of runway remaining exceeded that required by the Boeing 707 for take off, rejected take off or landing. But no allowances were made for an aircraft that was not functioning normally, as in the case of Flight 800. Thus a maintenance compactor was crossing the runway from the right at the moment the aircraft was attempting to halt its take off; due to the aforementioned thrust asymmetry, the aircraft was unable to avoid the compactor and the number 4 engine impacted it, tearing that engine from its wing pylon.

Despite the aircraft crew following proper procedures for a rejected take off (powering down engines and hydraulic systems) after the aircraft halted, fuel leaking from the wing tanks connected to the damaged pylon caught fire, likely due to exposed and sparking electrical wiring caused by the damage. After being informed of the fire the crew activated the engine fire-suppression systems, but this had no effect as the fuel and flames had already spread to the point that they hindered evacuation efforts. Eventually the fire reached the fuselage fuel tanks, which were mostly empty except for volatile fuel vapours that ignited and exploded, destroying the aircraft.

As the NTSB did not exist at the time of this accident, records of the reasons for engine 4's apparent failure, and why engine 2's thrust reverser was disconnected, are difficult to find. More information can be found in a book published in 1967, called Airline Safety is a Myth. It was written by the captain of this aircraft, Vernon William Lowell. He survived the accident and went on to become a passionate advocate for improved safety in airline travel; many of his suggestions were subsequently implemented.

References

Aviation accidents and incidents in 1964
Aviation accidents and incidents in Italy
Accidents and incidents involving the Boeing 707
800
1964 in Italy
November 1964 events in Europe
Airliner accidents and incidents caused by engine failure